The Metro Manila leg of the PiliPinas Debates 2016 is the first vice presidential televised debate of the 2016 Philippine elections and the only VP debate under the PiliPinas Debates series, held at the Quadricentennial Pavilion at the University of Santo Tomas in Manila on April 10, 2016. It was organized by COMELEC and KBP with CNN Philippines, and Business Mirror as media partners. The debate was moderated by CNN Philippines chief correspondent Pia Hontiveros and senior anchor Pinky Webb. The coverage also included a pre-debate show and post-debate analysis anchored by Amelyn Veloso with panelists Atty. Karen Jimeno, Nicole Curato and Dindo Manhit.

The debate proper took around 128 minutes and there were 7 commercial breaks during the program which had a combined duration of 42 minutes.

PiliPinas 2016 The Vice Presidential Debates with a replay on the following day on TV5.

Debate proper

Yes or No portion
Here are the six vice-presidentiables stand on country's issues. Each candidate used the "thumbs up" sign if he/she agrees, and "thumbs down" sign if he/she disagrees.

Reception

Social media
Social media users from Twitter gave their good reviews on the debates on the outcome of the well organized debate produced by CNN Philippines. Netizens also took their high praises for both Hontiveros and Webb for carefully handled and moderated the debate proceedings.

See also
 List of programs broadcast by CNN Philippines

References

Pilipinas Debates 2016
Metro Manila